Park Sung-hwa (Hangul: 박성화; born 7 May 1955) is a South Korean football manager and a former football player. He is a gold medalist in the 1978 Asian Games.

Managerial career 
After his playing career, Park managed Yukong Elephants and Pohang Steelers in the K League. He led Pohang to two consecutive titles in the Asian Club Championship. Park also managed South Korean national youth teams in 2003 FIFA World Youth Championship, 2005 FIFA World Youth Championship, and 2008 Summer Olympics.

Park was the head coach of Myanmar and Myanmar under-23s, until his dismissal on 16 December 2013, two weeks before his contract ran out. His sacking was caused by a 1–0 defeat to Indonesian under-23 team in the group stage of the 2013 Southeast Asian Games. Myanmar hosted the competition, but was eliminated before the knockout stage due to this defeat.

Career statistics

International
Results list South Korea's goal tally first.

Honours

Player
Korea University
Korean National Championship: 1974, 1976
Korean President's Cup runner-up: 1976

ROK Army
Korean Semi-professional League (Spring): 1980
Korean President's Cup runner-up: 1980

Hallelujah FC
K League 1: 1983

POSCO Atoms
K League 1: 1986

South Korea
Asian Games: 1978

Individual
Korean National Championship Best Player: 1976
Korean FA Best XI: 1976, 1977, 1978, 1979, 1981, 1983, 1984
Korean President's Cup top goalscorer: 1977
Korean FA Player of the Year: 1979
K League 1 Most Valuable Player: 1983
K League 1 Best XI: 1983, 1984
AFC Asian All Stars: 1985

Manager
Yukong Elephants
Korean League Cup: 1994

Pohang Steelers
Korean FA Cup: 1996
Korean League Cup runner-up: 1996, 1997+
Asian Club Championship: 1996–97, 1997–98

South Korea U20
AFC Youth Championship: 2002, 2004

Individual
AFC Coach of the Month: April 1998, February 1999

See also
 List of men's footballers with 100 or more international caps

References

External links
 
 Park Sung-hwa – National team stats at KFA 
 
 

1955 births
Living people
Association football forwards
South Korean footballers
South Korea international footballers
South Korean football managers
Jeju United FC managers
Busan IPark managers
Pohang Steelers managers
Pohang Steelers players
Hallelujah FC players
Gyeongnam FC managers
Dalian Shide F.C. managers
K League 1 players
K League 1 Most Valuable Player Award winners
1980 AFC Asian Cup players
1984 AFC Asian Cup players
South Korea national football team managers
South Korean expatriate footballers
Sportspeople from Ulsan
Korea University alumni
Expatriate football managers in China
South Korean expatriate sportspeople in Myanmar
Myanmar national football team managers
Asian Games gold medalists for South Korea
Medalists at the 1978 Asian Games
Asian Games medalists in football
South Korean expatriate football managers
FIFA Century Club
Footballers at the 1978 Asian Games